Tarrian LaShun Pace (September 6, 1961 – March 21, 2022), professionally known as LaShun Pace and sometimes credited as LaShun Pace-Rhodes or Shun Pace-Rhodes, was an American Grammy Award–nominated gospel singer–songwriter and evangelist. Pace was also a Stellar Award winner.

Biography

Early life and education
Pace was the fifth of ten children born to Pastor Murphy J. Pace and Bettie Ann Pace in Atlanta. Pace along with her sisters and brother were raised in a small community called Poole Creek. For high school, Pace attended Walter F. George High School (now known as South Atlanta High School); graduating in 1979.

Career
Pace began singing professionally during her teen years in the mid–1970s, performing solo and later alongside her sisters in the group The Anointed Pace Sisters which formed in the late–1980s. Pace's singing and ministering skills were honed while she was on tour with the Rev. Gene Martin and the Action Revival Team, and in 1988 she recorded In the House of the Lord with Dr. Jonathan Greer and the Cathedral of Faith Church of God in Christ Choirs for Savoy Records. The label signed Pace as a solo artist soon afterwards. In 1990, she released her debut album He Lives, which reached the number two spot on the Billboard gospel charts and featured her signature song "I Know I've Been Changed". The follow-up song Shekinah Glory, appeared in 1993. Three years later, Pace returned with Wealthy Place, which included the song "Act Like You Know" featuring Karen Clark Sheard.

In addition to successive releases such as 1998's Just Because God Said It, Pace also enjoyed a career as an actress, most notably co-starring as the Angel of Mercy in the 1992 Steve Martin film Leap of Faith. LaShun Pace was inducted into the Christian Music Hall of Fame in 2007. She was to attend the official presentation ceremony with many guests to be formally inducted, but became ill and unable to attend. In 2009, LaShun was nominated for Urban Performer of the Year in the Visionary Awards. Winners were to be announced live during the 2009 Christian Music Hall of Fame Awards Show on November 14, 2009.

Personal
Pace was married once to Edward Rhodes, a Georgia–based pastor from 1986 until divorcing in 1999. Together they had two daughters; Xenia Pace Rhodes (b. August 31, 1989–d. February 11, 2001) and Aarion Pace Rhodes. In 2003, Pace released an autobiography entitled For My Good But For His Glory in which she discussed a wide range of topics, including the death of her first-born daughter, Xenia who had an enlarged heart and died of a heart attack.

Illness and death
Pace had been on dialysis for several years and was awaiting a kidney. She died of organ failure according to her family on March 21, 2022, at the age of 60.

Discography 
In the House of the Lord with Dr. Jonathan Greer and the Cathedral of Faith Choir (1988)
He Lives (1990)
Shekinah Glory (1993)
A Wealthy Place (1996)
Just Because God Said It (1998)
God is Faithful (2001)
It's My Time (2005)
Complete (2007)
Reborn (2011)
"By Your Word" (2014)
"Joy" (2019)
"The Spirit" (2021)

References

 FindAGrave 
 
The official Christian Music Hall of Fame and Museum page announcing both her induction into the Hall of Fame and the 2009 Awards Show information page.
 
 

1961 births
2022 deaths
African-American women songwriters
American gospel singers
American autobiographers
Musicians from Atlanta
Writers from Atlanta
American Pentecostals
Members of the Church of God in Christ
Women autobiographers
Songwriters from Georgia (U.S. state)
American women non-fiction writers
20th-century African-American women singers
21st-century African-American women singers